Aqua Teen Hunger Force Colon Movie Film for Theaters (also known as Aqua Teen Hunger Force: Movie Film for Theaters) is a 2007 American adult animated surreal black comedy film based on the Adult Swim animated series Aqua Teen Hunger Force. The film was produced, written and directed by series creators Matt Maiellaro and Dave Willis, and features the voices of Dana Snyder, Carey Means, Willis, Maiellaro, Mike Schatz, Andy Merrill, C. Martin Croker, and Neil Peart of the Canadian rock band Rush, with Bruce Campbell, Tina Fey, Fred Armisen, and Chris Kattan in cameo appearances.

The film centers around Master Shake, Frylock and Meatwad, better known as the Aqua Teens, as they join forces with the Plutonians and the Cybernetic Ghost of Christmas Past from the Future to prevent a piece of exercise equipment from creating destruction, all while the Aqua Teens must puzzle together their existence and search for their creator.

During an interview at the 2005 San Diego Comic-Con, Maiellaro and Snyder stated that rumors of a feature-length film based on Aqua Teen Hunger Force would be made. Maiellaro would also describe the film as "an action piece that leads into the origin story that unfolds in a very 'Aqua Teen' way." As production went on, several cameos, including Peart, Armisen and Campbell, were confirmed. On April 1, 2007, Adult Swim premiered the movie just a week before the main release; however, in honor of the block's annual April Fools' Day traditions, the film remained in a small picture-in-picture box at the bottom left corner, with no sounds.

Aqua Teen Hunger Force Colon Movie Film for Theaters premiered at New York City on April 10, 2007, and was released theatrically on April 13, 2007, by First Look Pictures, and grossed $5.5 million on a $750,000 budget, making it the twelfth highest-grossing R-rated animated film. The film received mixed reviews from critics, who praised its humor but criticized its plot and runtime. It marks the first and only time an Adult Swim series was adapted into a feature film, and is the second Cartoon Network-owned property to receive a theatrical feature film adaptation after The Powerpuff Girls Movie (2002), with the difference being due to that film's box office failure, Warner Bros. did not distribute this film's theatrical run. Warner Home Video released the film on a two-disc DVD on August 14, 2007. The film was submitted for the Academy Award for Best Animated Feature for the 80th Academy Awards, but was not nominated.

A sequel titled Death Fighter was announced, but was ultimately scrapped in 2015. However, a second Aqua Teen Hunger Force film was officially confirmed by Adult Swim on May 12, 2021. The second film, titled Aqua Teen Forever: Plantasm, was released direct-to-video on November 8, 2022, and on HBO Max starting February 8, 2023.

Plot 
Before the main feature, a faux theatre concession stand advertisement plays. A group of anthropomorphic theater snacks, The Soda Dog Refreshment Band, sings a spoof of Let's All Go to the Lobby until they are interrupted by another snack band (performed by Mastodon). They proceed to loudly sing some of their own bizarre theater rules as a death metal song before finishing on a guitar solo.

The film starts properly in Egypt in a purposely indeterminable time, where Master Shake, a milkshake, Frylock, a box of french fries, and Meatwad, a ball of ground meat, break free from within the Sphinx and are attacked by an oversized poodle who kills Frylock before Shake defeats it. Shake and Meatwad flee with Frylock's corpse and meet "Time Lincoln", who revives Frylock. When the Central Intelligence Agency break into his house, Time Lincoln helps the Aqua Teens escape in a wooden rocket ship. Time Lincoln is shot, changing history and resulting in the Confederate States of America's winning the American Civil War, with the CIA agents being made slaves to a Black Kentucky Colonel as punishment for their crimes against the South. All this, however, is just an elaborate story concocted by Shake to explain their origin to Meatwad. Meanwhile, a slice of watermelon named Walter Melon observes events of the Aqua Teens from his watermelon spaceship, including a backyard concert performed by Meatwad and his dolls.

When Shake plans to use his new exercise machine; the Insanoflex, Frylock notices that it is not assembled properly, and the instructions cannot be found. After searching for them online, he finds a message warning not to assemble the machine. Frylock calls the website's listed phone number, which is revealed to be that of Emory and Oglethorpe, the Plutonians. Before bothering answering the phone, they discover the Cybernetic Ghost of Christmas Past from the Future on board with them. The Ghost explains to the two aliens the story of the Insanoflex: the machine, when assembled, will exercise a man into a super-being, who will attract all the women on Earth, leading to massive inbreeding and the eventual extinction of mankind. To prevent this, the Ghost travels to the past (not before traveling forward to The Bahamas first) and steals a screw that holds the machine together. The Plutonians, now determined to get the machine, point out to him that the screw could easily be replaced: someone can buy another screw or shove a pencil into the screw hole.

Back on Earth, Frylock finishes re-building the Insanoflex with a pencil in the screw hole, but he discovers the circuit board is missing. The trio visit their short-tempered, foul-mouthed, sarcastic neighbor Carl Brutananadilewski, from whom Shake had stolen the machine, to see if he has the missing piece. After Carl refuses to tell them, Meatwad finds the address in the Insanoflex's box. Dr. Weird, whose abandoned asylum has been purchased and turned into a condominium, is visited by Shake, Frylock, and Meatwad. Frylock retrieves the missing circuit board and installs it into the machine. Carl insists that as the rightful owner he should be the first to test the machine. The Insanoflex straps him in and transforms itself into a giant one-eyed robot. The robot plays techno music and heads for downtown Philadelphia, all while Carl's strapped-in form is forced to exercise. Eventually, the robot begins laying metallic eggs, which hatch into smaller versions of the machine.

The Aqua Teens, aided by an instructional workout video, find that the Insanoflex can be destroyed using music. After a failed encounter with MC Pee Pants (reincarnated as a fly) The Aqua Teens have no choice but to have Shake play his music. Shake poorly plays his original song "Nude Love" on acoustic guitar, forcing the Insanoflex to commit suicide. Carl (now bulging with so much muscle) leaves with his newly found date, a bodybuilder named Linda, and they head back to her condo while the Aqua Teens try to figure out a way to stop the newly hatched machines from destroying the city.

After a pointless time travel, the Aqua Teens travel back to Dr. Weird's condo to confront him, where Frylock begins to tell the origin story of the Aqua Teens: they were created by Dr. Weird, along with a chicken nugget named Chicken Bittle. In the flashback, Dr. Weird proclaims that the Aqua Teens were created for one purpose: to crash a jet into a brick wall. Realizing the pointlessness of this mission, Frylock diverted the jet and set a course to Africa, where they would try to solve world hunger. Upon entering Africa, Bittle was eaten by a lion and the presence of the Aqua Teens scare a tribe of natives. After realizing they couldn't be much help, they returned to the United States and rented a house in New Jersey, where they would start their new lives as regular civilians. Shake and Meatwad do not recall their missions, due to the fact that they've been playing with their Game Boy to pay any attention.

Meanwhile, Carl and Linda recline in her room, where she reveals "herself" to be Dr. Weird in disguise. He cuts off Carl's muscles and grafts them onto his own body. Frylock and Dr. Weird do battle while they argue back and forth about who created whom. Dr. Weird claims that it was Frylock who created him, not the other way around. Dr. Weird shows Frylock a teddy bear filled with razor blades. Shake tries to take the teddy bear, but he loses his hand. Dr. Weird then reveals that the blue diamond on Frylock's back hides a VCR, in which a videotape with false memories of Dr. Weird creating Frylock had been playing in Frylock's head. Frylock also admits that he is a transsexual lesbian trapped in a man's body. Just then, Walter Melon arrives in his ship. Meatwad mentions he saw the ship earlier. Shake calls him a liar and shoots him with a shotgun. Shake gets concerned when Meatwad does not reform like always. Walter tells his partner, Neil Peart, the drummer of the rock band Rush, to play the "Drum Solo Of Life" to bring Meatwad back to life. Meanwhile, Shake tries to pick up the teddy bear for the second time, losing his other hand. Melon explains he created the Aqua Teens and all the other characters, including the Insanoflex. His plan was that they would kill each other and Walter would inherit their real estate in order to create the "Insano-Gym". The others inform Walter that they rent and do not own property, proving Walter's plan pointless. Walter storms off. The Teens see their alleged mother standing before them, revealed to be a burrito. Shake suddenly jumps out the window upon hearing this news, Meatwad hugs her, and Frylock states, "That's neat". The movie ends with The Soda Dog Refreshment Band singing the audience out again, only for the band to insult the audience instead.

In a post-credit scene, The Cybernetic Ghost is seen humping the TV in the Aqua Teens living room. Then Frylock (who went through a sex change) tells him that it's time for bed.

Cast 

 Dana Snyder as Master Shake
 Carey Means as Frylock
 Dave Willis as Meatwad, Carl, Ignignokt and Video Game Voice
 Matt Maiellaro as Err, Cybernetic Ghost and Satan
 Andy Merrill as Oglethorpe
 Mike Schatz as Emory
 C. Martin Croker as Dr. Weird and Steve
 Bruce Campbell as Chicken Bittle
 Neil Peart as himself
 Chris Kattan as Walter Melon
 MC Chris as MC Pee Pants
 Fred Armisen as Time Lincoln
 George Lowe as Space Ghost
 Isaac Hayes III as Plantation Owner
 Tina Fey as Burrito
 H. Jon Benjamin as CIA Agent 1
 Jon Glaser as CIA Agent 2
 Craig Hartin as Rob Goldstein
 Matt Harrigan as Linda
 Mastodon (uncredited) as Interrupting Snack Band

Production

Development 
In an interview at the 2005 San Diego Comic-Con, Dana Snyder and Matt Maiellaro confirmed rumors that there would be a feature-length movie of Aqua Teen Hunger Force. More details were revealed at the 2005 Paley Television Festival, such as a possible cameo by 80s funk group Cameo, and Maiellaro described it as "an action piece that leads into an origin story that unfolds in a very 'Aqua Teen' way."

The creators revealed much more information in an interview with Wizard Entertainment. While they dodged many questions, they confirmed that the film would run 80 minutes, be produced on a meager $750,000 budget, and feature a plot detail about a "lost Aqua Teen", who is a large chicken nugget named "Chicken Bittle" (voiced by Bruce Campbell). They also confirmed more cameos, with Rush drummer and lyricist Neil Peart, voice actor H. Jon Benjamin and his comedy partner Jon Glaser, and Saturday Night Lives Fred Armisen making appearances. Heavy metal band Mastodon stated in a Decibel article that they would be performing during the opening, and that the band would be animated as a bucket of popcorn, a soda, a hot dog, and a candy bar. They were actually animated as a pretzel, a pile of nachos, an "Icecaps" box, and a gumdrop.

Music 

Aqua Teen Hunger Force Colon Movie Film for Theaters Colon the Soundtrack was released on April 10, 2007 It features many previously unreleased songs, some recorded for the purpose of the album. In addition, the compilation features an intro/outro titled "Nude Love" by Master Shake, a track from MC Chris, film skits and sound bites, and a new rendition of the Aqua Teen Hunger Force theme by rapper Schoolly D.

The album features mix of musical styles ranging from heavy metal, indie rock and hip-hop; and also features new, original music from Mastodon, Killer Mike and Unearth. Noticeably missing is "In the Air Tonight" by Phil Collins, which is prominently featured at the end of the film.

 Master Shake – "Nude Love" – 1:27
 Soda Dog Refreshment Squad – "Groovy Time for a Movie Time" – 0:48
 Mastodon – "Cut You Up With a Linoleum Knife" – 1:50
 Early Man – "More to Me Than Meat and Eyes" – 3:11
 Schoolly D – "Aqua Teen Hunger Force Theme" (Remix) – 1:34
 Meatwad – Skit – 0:18
 Unearth – "The Chosen" – 3:50
 Andrew W.K. – "Party Party Party" – 1:56
 Carl Brutananadilewski – Skit – 0:15
 Nine Pound Hammer – "Carl's Theme" – 2:42
 Brass Castle – "Bookworm Resin" – 3:34
 Master Shake – Skit – 0:22
 Killer Mike – "Blam Blam" – 6:12
 Insane-O-Flex – "I Like Your Booty (But I'm Not Gay)" – 2:04
 mc chris – "I Want Candy" – 2:03
 The Hold Steady – "Girls Like Status" – 2:43
 Master Shake – "Nude Love (Reprise)" – 9:28
 features hidden tracks
 Meatwad and Superchunk – "Misfits and Mistakes"
 Master Shake and Nashville Pussy – "Face Omelet"
 Carl Brutananadilewski – Skit
 Matt Maiellaro – Guitar Solo

Marketing 
The film's poster was illustrated by Julie Bell and Boris Vallejo, and parodies the "King of the Mountain" design.

Boston Mooninite panic 

On January 31, 2007, police in Boston, Massachusetts received reports of devices resembling bombs in various places around the city. The devices turned out to be electronic signs similar to a Lite-Brite that displayed images of the Mooninites Ignignokt and Err giving the finger, and were designed to promote the Aqua Teen Hunger Force television show as part of a guerrilla marketing campaign authorized by Cartoon Network, the cartoon's parent company. The boards were present in several cities for weeks before the ones in Boston were reported.

The Boston City Government sought a reimbursement for the money spent responding to the incident. The amount quoted was $500,000 initially, and then was increased to $750,000.

On February 5, it was announced that Turner Broadcasting and the city of Boston have reached an agreement to pay $2 million to offset the cost of removing the devices: $1 million to cover the cost of the agencies involved and an additional $1 million in goodwill funding to homeland security.

An episode from season five titled "Boston" was produced as the series creators' response to the scare, but Adult Swim pulled it to avoid further controversy surrounding the events of the bomb scare.

April Fools' Day television "premiere" 

Adult Swim began running advertisements on March 25, 2007, advertising the television premiere of the movie the following Sunday, April 1, 2007. Its only reasoning behind this stunt, as stated in the advertisement, was "because we're fucking crazy". While Adult Swim's TV listings on its website stated the movie would be shown, other TV listings reported the same Sunday block. The stunt was, in actuality, yet another one of Adult Swim's annual April Fools' pranks: though the first few minutes of the movie were shown normally, the remainder was shown in a small picture-in-picture box in the bottom left-hand corner, with no sound, over the normal programming and occasional giant pop-ups alerting viewers of its presence, as well as advertising the actual premiere. The advertising was shown again on one episode of a Family Guy marathon on July 6, 2007. The movie eventually was shown in full on Sunday, March 30, 2008. The day after the April Fools' joke, Cartoon Network showed another bumper, stating, "Sorry you will still have to pay to actually see the movie. But thanks for the ratings!"

Fake endings 
In yet another promotional stunt, the "ending" to the movie was posted in various places including YouTube, KingColon.com (in the Worst Game Ever game), and fansite "Aqua Teen Central": each ending was completely different.

Eventually, the Adult Swim website let it be known that none of the "endings" were real and presented seven more clips (which were fake as well) throughout the weeks following the film's release.

These endings, now called the "fake.com endings", are available on the film's "Extras" DVD on the 2-Disc Collector's Edition. These endings are parodies of other films. For example, one of the endings spoofs The Terminator, featuring Meatwad as "The Determinator".

Release

Home media 

Warner Home Video released Aqua Teen Hunger Force Colon Movie Film for Theaters in a two-disc DVD edition on August 14, 2007. For the DVD release, the studio changed the title of the eighty-seven-minute full-length movie to Aqua Teen Hunger Force Colon Movie Film for Theaters for DVD, just like the film soundtrack's title. The DVD features include the ten fake endings as shown on the internet, a "making of" featurette, promos, the "Deleted Scenes" episode, a music video, and an eighty-minute animatic (rough cut) of the movie made out of the deleted scenes from the film and scenes from the "Deleted Scenes" episode as well as a commentary. Rock and Roll Hall of Fame inductee Patti Smith is featured on the DVD commentary. The scene after the credits was removed from the UK DVD release.

The set also features the season four episode "Deleted Scenes" (also known as "Star-Studded Xmas Spectacular"), which makes heavy references and parallels to the film that originally aired years prior to the film's release on December 18, 2005.

The film is also available in HD and SD on iTunes Store, Amazon Prime Video, and Microsoft Movies & TV.

Reception

Box office 
The film was a box office success, earning $3,088,000 in its opening weekend at no. 13. It grossed $5,520,368 domestically against its $750,000 budget, making it the 8th highest grossing R-rated animated film at the time. It is currently ranked as the 12th highest grossing R-rated animated film of all time.

Critical response 
With 28 reviews compiled, Metacritic reported that Movie Film for Theaters has received an average rating of 54/100, indicating "mixed or average reviews". Rotten Tomatoes gave the film an approval rating of 48% based on reviews from 84 critics, with an average rating of 5.4/10. The website's consensus states: "The non sequitur humor of Aqua Teen Hunger Force will surely appeal to its built-in fanbase, but for the uninitiated, the premise wears thin". Reviews ranged from Glenn Kenny at Premiere magazine, who stated that he was tempted to refer to the film as "the most successful full-on surrealist film since Buñuel and Dalí's 1930 L'Age d'Or", to Ty Burr of The Boston Globe, who called it "an act of terrorism against entertainment". The film was given a thumbs down on the television show At the Movies with Ebert & Roeper; Richard Roeper criticized the runtime and calling it "unfunny", though he said the first five minutes were funny.

In response to such reviews, a commercial featuring the Mooninites began airing during the Adult Swim block. The two characters spend the entire commercial insulting a supposedly typical reviewer, "Lionel" of lionellovesmovies.com (the site merely leads back to the movie page). Other commercials recommend people see the film two or three more times to push the box office numbers up. Adult Swim also mentioned in one of its commercial bumpers that the review situation highlights the generation gap, and that most negative reviews came from much older critics.

Sequel 
There has been mention of producing a sequel titled Death Fighter. While little has been confirmed by Adult Swim in regards to the film, there have been many statements regarding it. On December 15, 2008, Dave Willis stated no script was written and that the film would be released in Spring 2009 (though, as he also stated that Death Fighter was a T-shirt he was working on, he likely wasn't being serious) Following this, in an April 2009 interview, Dave joked about the film lacking any sort of funding and being sold out of the back of his car. In a 2010 interview, staff members of Radical Axis confirmed that a sequel was indeed in production, and mentioned the possibility that the film might be made in 3D. When asked if the film was designed for a theatrical release, a Radical Axis staff member responded yes, but stated: "We're not sure if we have a distributor yet." This was then followed by the statement: "Adult Swim will never make another movie ever again." In 2012, Matt Maiellaro released more news regarding the film, that being: "It is all written and great. We are just trying to convince the network do it again. The first one was such a cash cow for them, not just box office but also ad sales in the movie. So it is kind of a no-brainer. So hopefully one day."

By 2014, the script had been completed and approved and would be released somewhere in mid 2015 and jokingly stated that the film was shelved as it was not G-rated; however, on April 25, 2015, at a C2CE convention panel, Willis indirectly stated that the project was scrapped, soon after announcing the show's cancellation. He later mentioned on Reddit that it would cost $3.4 million to produce, and expressed interest in doing a Kickstarter to fund it. He also reportedly stated that the film could potentially be released in the next 2 years.

On May 12, 2021, Adult Swim announced a second Aqua Teen Hunger Force film, as well as original films based on The Venture Bros. and Metalocalypse. All three films will be released on Blu-ray, DVD, and PVOD before arriving on HBO Max three months later. The film will release on November 8, 2022, as Aqua Teen Forever: Plantasm. A preview of the film was shown at Adult Swim Fest 2022.

See also 
 List of adult animated feature films
 List of American films of 2007

References

External links 

 
 
 
 
 

2007 films
2007 animated films
2000s American animated films
2000s monster movies
Adult animated comedy films
American adult animated films
American flash animated films
American computer-animated films
American black comedy films
2000s English-language films
Aqua Teen Hunger Force films
American monster movies
Giant monster films
Adult Swim films
American animated comedy films
Animated films based on animated series
Fictional depictions of Abraham Lincoln in film
Films based on television series
Films set in Egypt
Films set in New Jersey
Mad scientist films
Surreal comedy films
Films about trans women
2007 black comedy films
2007 comedy films
Films about food and drink